These are the Hong Kong Island results of the 2012 Hong Kong legislative election. The election was held on 9 September 2012 and all 7 seats in Hong Kong Island were contested. The pro-Beijing camp achieved a majority of Island seats for the first time with the Democratic Alliance for the Betterment and Progress of Hong Kong gained two seats with two separate lists led by Tsang Yok-sing and Christopher Chung respectively. Both Civic Party and People Power failed in getting the last seat in whom Tanya Chan placed second on the Civic's candidate list and Christopher Lau were defeated by Wong Kwok-hing from the Federation of Trade Unions. Besides, 24-year-long member Miriam Lau of the Liberal Party also lost in her first attempt of direct election.

Overall results
Before election:

Change in composition:

Candidates list

Results by districts

Opinion polling

See also
Legislative Council of Hong Kong
Hong Kong legislative elections
2012 Hong Kong legislative election

References

2012 Hong Kong legislative election